The Quakertown Passenger and Freight Station is a historic train station and freight depot located at Quakertown, Bucks County, Pennsylvania. The two buildings were designed by Wilson Bros. & Company in 1889 and built by Cramp and Co. for the Philadelphia and Reading Railroad in 1902. The passenger station is constructed of dark Rockhill granite and Indiana limestone and is in a Late Victorian style. It has a hipped roof with an eight-foot overhang. Also on the property is a large crane that was used for freight movement. The Quakertown station had passenger rail service along the Bethlehem Line to Bethlehem and Philadelphia until July 27, 1981, when SEPTA ended service on all its intercity diesel-powered lines. SEPTA still owns the line and leases it to the East Penn Railroad. Other towns, stations, and landmarks on the Bethlehem Line are Perkasie, Pennsylvania, Perkasie Tunnel, and Perkasie station.

It was added to the National Register of Historic Places in 2000.

Lehigh Valley Transit interurbans ran on Main Street, roughly one mile to the west.

See also
National Register of Historic Places listings in Bucks County, Pennsylvania

References

Railway freight houses on the National Register of Historic Places
Railway stations on the National Register of Historic Places in Pennsylvania
Railway buildings and structures on the National Register of Historic Places in Pennsylvania
Railway stations in the United States opened in 1889
Former railway stations in Bucks County, Pennsylvania
Former Reading Company stations
Former SEPTA Regional Rail stations
National Register of Historic Places in Bucks County, Pennsylvania